Martha Vanessa Antonio del Moral-Kier, better known by her screen name Vaness del Moral-Kier (born May 23, 1988), is a Filipino actress, dancer, singer, and a talent at one of the top management groups in the Philippines, the GMA Artist Center. She started her showbiz career through the interactive reality television show, StarStruck. She was eventually eliminated in Week 2. She is best known as Hillary Suarez in Widows' Web

Early life
She was born in Baguio, Benguet, Philippines.

StarStruck

StarStruck Season 3: The Nationwide Invasion started November 28, 2005, and ended on March 12, 2006 (the Final Judgement) airing on Philippine TV replacing Darna. From millions of hopefuls from different provinces all over the Philippines, only 14 will have the chance to survive. If in the first two seasons, StarStruck is shown only weekdays having Friday as Elimination Night, this season Mondays to Fridays will be tests and Sundays would be the elimination night. The show held its Final Judgment on March 12, 2006.

This time, from the two Ultimate Survivors, a Sole Survivor will be picked who will win more than 10 million pesos worth of prizes, consisting of an exclusive GMA talent management contract, a new house and lot, a large cash prize and a livelihood showcase.

This season was hosted by Dingdong Dantes, Jolina Magdangal and Raymond Gutierrez, and members of The Council were Joey de Leon, Lorna Tolentino and Louie Ignacio.

Del Moral made it through to the Top 14 but was eliminated too early. She was eliminated on December 25, 2005 (Christmas Day).

Post-StarStruck
Del Moral might be one of the first avengers of third season of StarStruck, but she proved to the people that even though she left too early on the show, she can have the "staying power" in show business industry. One great evidence on that is that she appeared in some of GMA's major shows such as Dyesebel, Zaido: Pulis Pangkalawakan and in Impostora. She is also in the movie One True Love. Recently, del Moral played Dennis Trillo's sister in Adik Sa'Yo. After her Adik Sa'yo Role, she played Jennylyn Mercado's cousin in Ikaw Sana. In 2010, she is in the Sine Novela's Gumapang Ka Sa Lusak and even the show is still in air, she is now had her biggest break yet, her villain role in Basahang Ginto opposite Carla Abellana. After her Basahang Ginto stint, Vaness also starred in the 2012 soap Faithfully and 2013 soap Kahit Nasaan Ka Man. In 2014 during daytime drama The Half Sisters as Jackie Perez. In 2016 she Joins in Encantadia sa Gurna originally played by Girlie Sevilla.

Filmography

Television

References

External links
Vaness del Moral on iGMA.tv

StarStruck
StarStruck on IMDb

1988 births
Living people
Filipino child actresses
GMA Network personalities
Ilocano people
People from Baguio
StarStruck (Philippine TV series) participants
Filipino film actresses
Filipino television actresses